Ruca or RUCA may refer to:

Ruca, Côtes-d'Armor, a commune in France
Ruca (house type), a traditional Mapuche house type
Rural–urban commuting area, a classification scheme used by the United States Census Bureau

People 
Ruca (footballer, born January 1990), Portuguese footballer for Oliveira do Hospital
Ruca (footballer, born September 1990), Portuguese footballer for Penafiel